Heterops bipartitus is a species of beetle in the family Cerambycidae. It was described by Lacordaire in 1869.

References

Heteropsini
Beetles described in 1869